William Palmer may refer to:

Politics
 William A. Palmer (1781–1860), American politician
 William D. Palmer (born 1935), American politician in Iowa
 William Palmer (Irish politician), Chief Secretary for Ireland 1696–97
 William Palmer, 2nd Earl of Selborne (1859–1942), British politician
 William Palmer (Bridgnorth MP) for Bridgnorth
 William Palmer (Malmesbury MP) for Malmesbury
William le Palmer, MP for Leicester
William Palmer (Leicester MP) represented Leicester (UK Parliament constituency)

Religion
 William Palmer (theologian) (1803–1885), Anglican theologian and liturgical scholar
 William Palmer (theologian and ecumenist) (1811–1879), English theologian and antiquarian
 William Palmer (Dean of Johannesburg) (1881–1953), Anglican priest

Sports
 William Palmer (cricketer, born 1736) (1737–1790), English cricketer
 William Palmer (cricketer, born 1847) (1847–1906), English cricketer
 William Palmer (athlete) (1882–1967), British Olympic athlete
 Billy Palmer (baseball), Major League Baseball pitcher, 1885
 Billy Palmer (1887–1955), English footballer
 William Palmer (soccer), American soccer player in the National Soccer Hall of Fame

Other
 William Palmer (barrister) (1802–1858), English legal writer and Gresham Professor of Law
 William Palmer (murderer) (1824–1856), doctor and multiple murderer
 William Isaac Palmer (1824–1893), English businessman
 William Jackson Palmer (1836–1909), American industrialist and general
 William Henry Palmer (1835–1926), American soldier
 William C. Palmer (1906–1987), American painter
 William Palmer (novelist) (born 1943), professor of English and author
 William Devereux Palmer, engineer
 William Palmer (sculptor), English sculptor and builder
 William Palmer, founder of Palmer's College in Thurrock

See also
Bill Palmer (disambiguation)
Willard Palmer (1917–1996), American musician and composer